This is a breakdown of the results of the 2013 German federal election. The following tables display detailed results in each of the sixteen states and all 299 single-member constituencies.

Electoral system 
According to Article 38 of the Basic Law for the Federal Republic of Germany, members of the Bundestag shall be elected in general, direct, free, equal and secret elections; everyone over the age of eighteen is entitled to vote.

In 2008, some modifications to the electoral system were required under an order of the Federal Constitutional Court. The court had found a provision in the Federal Election Law by which it was possible for a party to experience a negative vote weight, thus losing seats due to more votes, violated the constitutional guarantee of the electoral system being equal and direct.

The court allowed three years for these changes, so the 2009 federal election was not affected. The changes were due by 30 June 2011, but appropriate legislation was not completed by that deadline. A new electoral law was enacted in late 2011, but declared unconstitutional once again by the Federal Constitutional Court upon lawsuits from the opposition parties and a group of some 4,000 private citizens.

Finally, four of the five factions in the Bundestag agreed on an electoral reform whereby the number of seats in the Bundestag will be increased as much as necessary to ensure that any overhang seats are compensated through apportioned leveling seats, to ensure full proportionality according to the political party's share of party votes at the national level. The Bundestag approved and enacted the new electoral reform in February 2013.

The Bundestag is elected using mixed-member proportional representation, as of February 2013 this means each voter has two votes, a first vote for the election of a constituency candidate (by method of first-past-the-post), and a second vote for the election of a state list. The Sainte-Laguë/Schepers method is used to convert the votes into seats, in a two-stage process with each stage involving two calculations. First, the number of seats to be allocated to each state is calculated, based on the proportion of the German population living there. Then the seats in each state are allocated to the party lists in that state, based on the proportion of second votes each party received.

In the distribution of seats among state lists, only parties that have obtained at least five percent of the valid second votes cast in the electoral area or have won a seat in at least three constituencies are taken into consideration.

The minimum number of seats for each party at federal level is then determined. This is done by calculating, for each party state list, the number of constituency seats it won on the basis of the first votes, as well as the number of seats to which it is entitled on the basis of the second votes. The higher of these two figures is the party’s minimum number of seats in that state. Adding together the minimum number of seats to which the party is entitled in all of the states produces a total representing its guaranteed minimum number of seats in the country as a whole.

In order to ensure that each party receives its guaranteed minimum number of seats when the seats are allocated using the Sainte-Laguë/Schepers method, it may become necessary to increase the number of seats in the Bundestag. Then it must be ensured that the seats are distributed to the parties in line with their national share of the second votes.

Additional "overhang seats" (or "balance seats") are created to ensure that the distribution of the seats reflects the parties' share of the second votes and that no party receives fewer than its guaranteed minimum number of seats. Balance seats are also necessary to ensure that each party requires roughly the same number of second votes per seat. Once the number of seats which each party is entitled to receive across the country has been determined, the seats are allocated to the parties' individual state lists. Each state list must receive at least as many seats as the number of constituencies which the party won in the state in question.

Nationwide

Leaders' races

By state

Summary

Schleswig-Holstein

Mecklenburg-Vorpommern

Hamburg

Lower Saxony

Bremen

Brandenburg

Saxony-Anhalt

Berlin

North Rhine-Westphalia

Saxony

Hesse

Thuringia

Rhineland-Palatinate

Bavaria

Baden-Württemberg

Saarland

Notes

References

2013 elections in Germany
2013